Wenlong Subdistrict is a subdistrict in Qijiang District of Chongqing, China. The subdistrict is bordered to the north by the towns of Xinsheng and Anlan, to the east by the towns of Hengshan, Sanjiao, Shijiao and Sanjiang Subdistrict, to the south by Gunan Subdistrict, and to the west by the towns of Guangxing and Dushi.

History
Wenlong Subdistrict was established on December 1, 2007.

On 22 June 2020, parts of the subdistrict were submerged, with some roads underwater.

Administrative division
As of December 2019, the subdistrict is divided into seven villages and thirteen communities:
 Mengjiayuan Community
 Caiba Community
 Shifogang Community
 Daijiagang Community
 Changshenggou Community
 Yangjiawan Community
 Hetaowan Community
 Jiulong Community
 Shuanglong Community
 Huilongwan Community
 Shaxi Community
 Tianqiao Community
 Wenlong Community 
 Hongqi
 Chundeng
 Dongwu
 Songbang
 Taigong
 Baimiao
 Jinchai

Geography
The Qi River flows through the subdistrict.

Economy
The local economy is primarily based upon agriculture and local industry.

Transport
The G75 Lanzhou–Haikou Expressway passes across the town north to south.

References

Divisions of Qijiang District
Subdistricts of the People's Republic of China